Rev. Brian J. Shanley, O.P., S.T.L., Ph.D. (born July 7, 1958), is an American priest of the Order of Preachers and a former president of Providence College.  

Shanley was elected the 18th President of St. John's University in New York on November 24, 2020 and started his tenure on February 1, 2021.

Biography
Born in Warwick, Rhode Island, on July 7, 1958, Shanley holds a doctorate in philosophy from the University of Toronto and completed a post-doctoral fellowship at the University of Notre Dame's Center for Philosophy of Religion.

After completing undergraduate studies in history at Providence College in 1980, he earned a licentiate degree in philosophy from The Catholic University of America (CUA) where he later taught. He also holds a master of divinity and a licentiate degree in sacred theology from the Dominican House of Studies in Washington, D.C.

Ordained to the priesthood as a member of the Dominican Order of Preachers in 1987, Shanley taught philosophy at Providence College and was a visiting professor at Emory University's Candler School of Theology. He also served as an associate professor of philosophy at CUA.

During his time as President of Providence College, he likewise served as a member of the Providence College Board of Trustees and Corporation (with prior service as chair of the Board's Strategic Planning Committee). He has also been a member of the executive committee of the American Catholic Philosophical Association and formerly served as regent of studies for the Dominican Province of St. Joseph, during which time he held a seat on the Provincial Council, a body of 12 Dominican Friars serving as cabinet-level advisors to the prior provincial. He advised the Prior Provincial on all matters pertaining to the intellectual and academic life of the province.

On March 29, 2019, Shanley announced that, while the Providence College Board of Trustees had recommended that he serve another 5-year term, the Prior Provincial would not be making him available to do so. As a Dominican Friar, he accepted his superior's decision and concluded his service as President of Providence College at the end of his third term on June 30, 2020. 

Shanley previously served as both an associate editor and editor of The Thomist and as a member of the editorial board for the International Journal for Philosophy of Religion. Widely published in philosophy-focused academic journals, his research interests include Thomas Aquinas, philosophy of religion, metaphysics, medieval philosophy, and ethics.

Shanley assumed the office of President of St. John’s University in New York in February, 2021.

Shanley is an opera aficionado, enjoys golf, and practices Xing Yi Quan martial arts.

References

Living people
1958 births
American Dominicans
Providence College faculty
American Roman Catholic priests
People from Warwick, Rhode Island
Catholic University of America alumni
University of Notre Dame alumni
Providence College alumni
Catholics from Rhode Island